Agripino is a male Portuguese and Spanish given name. Notable people with the name include:

Given names
Agripino Cawich (1947–2003), Belizean politician
Agripino Núñez Collado (1933–2022), Roman Catholic clergyman and scholar from the Dominican Republic

Middle names
João Agripino da Costa Doria Júnior (born 1957), Brazilian politician
José Agripino Barnet (1864–1945), former Interim President of Cuba
José Agripino Maia (born 1945), Brazilian politician

Portuguese masculine given names
Spanish masculine given names